Penbrook is a borough in Dauphin County, Pennsylvania, United States, founded in 1861 and incorporated July 10, 1894. Penbrook was once named East Harrisburg and still maintains a Harrisburg postal ZIP code. The population was 3,268 at the 2020 census.

Penbrook is part of the Harrisburg–Carlisle Metropolitan Statistical Area.

Geography
Penbrook is located in southern Dauphin County at  (40.278445, -76.847463). It is bordered to the south by the city of Harrisburg.

Parks
Penbrook Park is an  recreational area in the southeast corner of the borough and contains ball fields, a large wooden play structure, basketball courts, concession stand, and a picnic pavilion. It was also the home of the former Penbrook Swim Club. The park is connected to the Capital Area Greenbelt, a  link to Riverfront Park and other regional parks.

It contains a ball field, a play structure with a large purple dinosaur, baseball field and basketball courts and is located near East Harrisburg Cemetery and the St. Margaret Mary school.

Since 1952, the Penbrook Athletic Association has led the community's recreational programs.

Government and politics
There are four voting precincts, one for each ward, though all four polling stations are located in the same room in the Community Building.

The mayor is John McDonald.

Borough council 
Two council members are elected from each of the borough's four wards.

1 Council President,  2 Council Vice President

Council meetings are held on the first Monday of every month at 6:30 pm at the Borough Building.

Caucus meetings are held on the third Monday of every month at 6:30 pm at the Borough Building.

Legislators
State Representative Sue Helm, Republican, 104th district
State Senator John DiSanto, Republican, 15th district
US Representative Scott Perry, Republican, 10th district

Demographics

As of the census of 2000, there were 3,044 people, 1,307 households, and 764 families residing in the borough. The population density was 6,636.1 people per square mile (2,555.0/km²). There were 1,398 housing units at an average density of 3,047.7 per square mile (1,173.4/km²). The racial makeup of the borough was 77.33% White, 15.24% African American, 0.23% Native American, 1.61% Asian, 1.87% from other races, and 3.71% from two or more races. Hispanic or Latino of any race were 4.60% of the population.

There were 1,307 households, out of which 30.0% had children under the age of 18 living with them, 39.6% were married couples living together, 15.6% had a female householder with no husband present, and 41.5% were non-families. 36.3% of all households were made up of individuals, and 10.0% had someone living alone who was 65 years of age or older. The average household size was 2.32 and the average family size was 3.04.

In the borough the population was spread out, with 26.3% under the age of 18, 8.1% from 18 to 24, 33.8% from 25 to 44, 20.1% from 45 to 64, and 11.7% who were 65 years of age or older. The median age was 35 years. For every 100 females, there were 93.9 males. For every 100 females age 18 and over, there were 92.2 males.

The median income for a household in the borough was $35,341, and the median income for a family was $44,375. Males had a median income of $32,128 versus $26,061 for females. The per capita income for the borough was $18,274. About 4.4% of families and 6.2% of the population were below the poverty line, including 8.7% of those under age 18 and 3.2% of those age 65 or over.

Education
Opening in 1901, and with additions in the 1930s and 1950s, the Penbrook School initially educated the students through 12 years, but later only educated children through 10th grade. Older students transferred to John Harris HS or Susquehanna Township HS.  In 1955, the school became part of the new Central Dauphin School District. The building served as an elementary school until 1982 and now serves as the home to Infinity Charter School. A reunion is held for former students in even-numbered years.

St. Margaret Mary Parish School of the Roman Catholic Diocese of Harrisburg was established in March 1948, with the School Sisters of Notre Dame teaching. Additions were made to the building in 1958, 1985, 2000 and 2011. In 2009 both 3-year-old and Pre-K programs were added. After the completion of a new church off campus, the original church was turned into a gym and multi-purpose area for the school and parish community.

See also
 Lincoln Cemetery

References

External links
Penbrook Borough official website

Populated places established in 1861
Harrisburg–Carlisle metropolitan statistical area
Boroughs in Dauphin County, Pennsylvania
1894 establishments in Pennsylvania